Skeen is a surname which may refer to:

Sir Andrew Skeen (1873–1935), British Indian Army general
Andrew Skeen (Rhodesia) (c.1906–1984), British Indian Army officer	 and Rhodesian politician
Buren Skeen (1936–1965), American NASCAR driver
Clifton Skeen (1927–1993), Ohio politician
Dale Skeen (born c.1955), American computer scientist
Dick Skeen (1906–1990), American professional tennis player
Henry Gene Skeen (1933–2006), U.S. Army general
Jack Skeen (1928–2001), New Zealand rugby union player
Jacob Skeen (born 1993), New Zealand rugby union player
Jamie Skeen (born 1988), American professional basketball player
Joe Skeen (1927–2003), American politician
Kasete Naufahu Skeen (born 1982), Tongan alpine skier
Ken Skeen (born 1942), English footballer
Mike Skeen (born 1986), American professional sports car racing driver
Odean Skeen (born 1994), Jamaican sprinter
W. L. H. Skeen (1847–1903), an English photographer in Ceylon (now Sri Lanka)